Grane (also Grâne) is a commune in the Drôme département in southeastern France.

Population

See also
Château de Grâne, ruined castle in the village
Communes of the Drôme department

References

Communes of Drôme